Alexandria League 1924–1953 & 1952–53, is an old Egyptian football tournament.
Before the start of Egyptian Premier League in its current form, the main competition was the Egypt Cup which started 1921. Egyptian federation started its 1st league competition (1938) in the form of regional leagues (Cairo, Alexandria, Bahary & Canal). The competition was played along with the new league form (1948–1953) then finally stopped. Five teams participated in this league El Ittihad Alexandria, El-Olympi, Teram & other clubs.

Honours
 
The past Winners are:

Performances

References

External links

Defunct football competitions in Egypt